George Michael (1963–2016) was an English singer, songwriter, and record producer, who was in the pop duo Wham! before starting a career as a solo pop musician. He sold more than 100 million records worldwide, making him one of the world's best-selling artists of all time, and had ten albums reach the Billboard 200. During his career as a solo musician, Michael released five studio albums: Faith (1987), Listen Without Prejudice Vol. 1 (1990), Older (1996), Songs from the Last Century (1999), and Patience (2004).

Michael received recognition in the United Kingdom, winning 5 awards from 24 nominations at the BRIT Awards; two of those awards were for "Best British Male" in 1988 and again in 1997. He also found success at the MTV Video Music Awards, receiving 4 awards from 16 nominations, including "Best Direction in a Video" for the song "Father Figure" in 1988. Michael's debut album Faith won multiple awards, including "Favorite Album (Soul/R&B)" from the American Music Awards and "Album of the Year" from the Grammy Awards. Overall, Michael received 56 awards from 173 nominations.

On 20 October 2016, it was announced that Michael was nominated for induction into the Songwriters Hall of Fame in 2017.

ASCAP Pop Music Awards
The American Society of Composers, Authors and Publishers (ASCAP) is a not-for-profit performance rights organization that protects its members' musical copyrights by monitoring public performances of their music, whether via a broadcast or live performance, and compensating them accordingly.

!Ref.
|-
| rowspan=3|1986
| "Wake Me Up Before You Go-Go"
| rowspan=11|Most Performed Songs 
| 
| rowspan=3|
|-
| "Careless Whisper"
| 
|-
| "Everything She Wants"
| 
|-
| 1987
| "I'm Your Man"
| 
| 
|-
| rowspan=3|1989
| "Faith"
| 
| rowspan=3|
|-
| "One More Try"
| 
|-
| "Father Figure"
| 
|-
| rowspan=2|1990
| "Kissing a Fool"
| 
| rowspan=2|
|-
| "Heaven Help Me"
| 
|-
| 1992
| "Praying for Time"
| 
| 
|-
| 1997
| "Jesus to a Child"
| 
|

American Music Awards
The American Music Awards is an annual awards ceremony created by Dick Clark in 1973. Michael received four awards from seven nominations.

|-
| rowspan="2" | 1986 || Wham! || Favorite Pop/Rock Band/Duo/Group Video Artist || 
|-
| "Careless Whisper" || Favorite Pop/Rock Single || 
|-
| 1988 || George Michael || Favorite Pop/Rock Male Artist || 
|-
| rowspan="4" | 1989 || rowspan="2" | George Michael || Favorite Pop/Rock Male Artist || 
|-
| Favorite Soul/R&B Male Artist || 
|-
| rowspan="2" | Faith || Favorite Pop/Rock Album || 
|-
| Favorite Soul/R&B Album ||

Billboard Music Awards

The Billboard Music Awards honor artists for commercial performance in the U.S., based on record charts published by Billboard. The awards are based on sales data by Nielsen SoundScan and radio information by Nielsen Broadcast Data Systems. The award ceremony was held from 1990 to 2007, until its reintroduction in 2011.

|-
| style="text-align:left;" rowspan="1"|1985
| rowspan=3|Himself
| rowspan=2|Top Producer
| 
|-
| style="text-align:left;" rowspan="4"|1986
| 
|-
| Top Hot 100 Artist
| 
|-
| rowspan=2|"A Different Corner"
| Top Hot 100 Song
|
|-
| Top Adult Contemporary Single
| 
|-
| style="text-align:left;" rowspan="10"|1987
| rowspan=5|Himself
| Top Hot 100 Artist
| 
|-
| Top Hot 100 Artist - Male
| 
|-
| Top Dance Club Play Artist
| 
|-
| Top Dance Sales Artist
| 
|-
| Top Producer
| 
|-
| "I Knew You Were Waiting (For Me)"
| rowspan=2|Top Hot 100 Song
| 
|-
| rowspan=4|"I Want Your Sex"
| 
|-
| Top Dance Club Play Single
| 
|-
| Top Dance Sales Single
| 
|-
| Top Hot Crossover Single
| 
|-
| style="text-align:left;" rowspan="22"|1988
| rowspan=18|Himself
| Top Artist
| 
|-
| Top Male Artist
| 
|-
| Top Billboard 200 Artist
|
|-
| Top Billboard 200 Artist - Male
|
|-
| Top Hot 100 Artist
| 
|-
| Top Hot 100 Artist - Male
| 
|-
| Top Crossover Artist
| 
|-
| Top R&B Artist
| 
|-
| Top R&B Artist - Male
| 
|-
| Top R&B Album Artist 
| 
|-
| Top R&B Album Artist - Male
| 
|-
| Top R&B Singles Artist 
| 
|-
| Top R&B Singles Artist - Male
| 
|-
| Top Adult Contemporary Artist 
| 
|-
| Top Adult Contemporary Artist - Male 
| 
|-
| Top Dance Club Play Artist
| 
|-
| Top Dance Club Play Artist - Male
| 
|-
| Top Dance Sales Artist
| 
|-
| "Faith"
| Top Hot 100 Song
| 
|-
| rowspan=3|Faith
| Top Billboard 200 Album
| 
|-
| Top Compact Disk
| 
|-
| Top R&B Album
| 
|-
| style="text-align:left;" rowspan="1"|1989
| Faith
| Top Billboard 200 Album
|
|-
| style="text-align:left;" rowspan="2"|2004
| Himself
| Top Hot Dance Singles Sales Artist
| 
|-
| "Amazing"
| Top Hot Dance Sales Single of the Year 
|

Brit Awards
The Brit Awards are the British Phonographic Industry's annual pop music awards. Michael received five awards from twenty four nominations.

|-
| 1984 || Wham! || British Breakthrough Act || 
|-
| rowspan="4" | 1985 || Wham! || British Group || 
|-
| "Careless Whisper" || British Single of the Year || 
|-
| "Last Christmas" || British Video of the Year || 
|-
| "Wake Me Up Before You Go-Go" || British Video of the Year || 
|-
| 1986 || Wham! || Outstanding Contribution to Music || 
|-
| rowspan="2" | 1988 || George Michael || British Male Solo Artist || 
|-
| Faith || British Album of the Year || 
|-
| 1989 || George Michael || British Male Solo Artist || 
|-
| rowspan="4" | 1991 || rowspan="2" | George Michael || British Male Solo Artist || 
|-
| British Producer of the Year || 
|-
| Listen Without Prejudice Vol. 1 || British Album of the Year || 
|-
| "Freedom! '90" || British Video of the Year || 
|-
| 1992 || George Michael || British Male Solo Artist || 
|-
| rowspan="2" | 1993 || George Michael || British Male Solo Artist || 
|-
| "Too Funky" || British Video of the Year || 
|-
| rowspan="4" | 1997 || George Michael || British Male Solo Artist || 
|-
| Older || British Album of the Year || 
|-
| rowspan="2" | "Fastlove" || British Single of the Year || 
|-
| British Video of the Year || 
|-
| rowspan="2" | 1999 || rowspan="2" | "Outside" || British Single of the Year || 
|-
| British Video of the Year || 
|-
| 2005 || "Amazing" || British Single of the Year || 
|-
| 2007 || George Michael || British Live Act ||

Camerimage
Camerimage is a Polish film festival dedicated to the celebration of cinematography.

|-
| 2014
| "Let Her Down Easy"
| Best Music Video
|

D&AD Awards
Design and Art Direction (D&AD) is a British educational charity which exists to promote excellence in design and advertising. 

|-
|1999
| "Outside"
| Pop Promo Video with a budget over £40.000
| style="background:#BF8040"| Wood Pencil

Danish Music Awards
The Danish Music Awards (DMA) is a Danish award show. The show has been arranged by IFPI since 1989, and was originally called IFPI-prisen ("IFPI-Award") until 1991, when it changed its name to Dansk Grammy ("Danish Grammy"). The current name was given in 2001, after the American Grammy Awards registered the name Grammy as their trademark. In 2011 IFPI joined together with TV2 (Denmark) and KODA to present the awards ceremony.

Michael received three awards in 1997.

|-
| rowspan="3" | 1997 
| George Michael || Foreign Male Singer || 
|-
| Older || International Album || 
|-
| "Fastlove, Pt. 1" || International Hit ||

ECHO Awards

The ECHO Award is a German music award granted every year by the Deutsche Phono-Akademie, an association of recording companies. Michael has two nominations.

|-
| 2000
| rowspan="2" | Himself
| rowspan="2" | Best International Male 
| rowspan="2" 
|-
| 2005
|-

GAFFA Awards
Delivered since 1991. The GAFFA Awards (Danish: GAFFA Prisen) are a Danish award that rewards popular music, awarded by the GAFFA magazine.

|-
| 1998
| George Michael
| Årets Udenlandske Sanger 
|

GLAAD Media Awards
The GLAAD Media Awards were formed in 1990 by the Gay & Lesbian Alliance Against Defamation. Michael received one nomination.

|-
| 2005 || Patience || Outstanding Music Artist ||

Golden Raspberry Awards
The Golden Raspberry Awards are parody awards honoring the worst of cinematic under-achievements. Michael won one award.

|-
| 1988 || "I Want Your Sex" || Worst Original Song ||

Grammy Awards
The Grammy Awards are awarded annually by the National Academy of Recording Arts and Sciences of the United States. Michael received two awards from eight nominations.

|-
| 1988 || "I Knew You Were Waiting (For Me)" || Best R&B Performance by a Duo or Group with Vocals || 
|-
| rowspan="2" | 1989 || Faith || Album of the Year || 
|-
| "Father Figure" || Best Male Pop Vocal Performance || 
|-
| 1992 || "Freedom! '90" || Best Male Pop Vocal Performance || 
|-
| 1993 || "Don't Let the Sun Go Down on Me" || Best Pop Performance by a Duo or Group with Vocals || 
|-
| 2001 || Songs from the Last Century || Best Traditional Pop Vocal Album || 
|-
| rowspan="2" | 2005 || "Amazing" || Best Remixed Recording, Non-Classical || 
|-
| "Flawless (Go to the City)" || Best Music Video ||

Helpmann Awards
The Helpmann Awards recognise distinguished artistic achievement and excellence in Australia's live performing arts sectors. 

|-
| 2010
| George Michael Live in Australia
| Best International Contemporary Music Concert
|

Hungarian Music Awards
Hungarian Music Awards is the national music awards of Hungary, held every year since 1992 and promoted by Mahasz.

|-
| 1994
| Five Live
| Best Concert Album
| 
|-
| 1997
| Older
| rowspan=3|Best Foreign Album
| 
|-
| 1999
| Ladies & Gentlemen: The Best of George Michael
| 
|-
| 2000
| Songs from the Last Century
|

International Dance Music Awards

The International Dance Music Award was established in 1985. It is a part of the Winter Music Conference, a weeklong electronic music event held annually.

 
|-
| 2005
| "Flawless (Go to the City)"
| Best Dance Video
|

International Rock Awards
The International Rock Awards (1989–91) was a music award ceremony broadcast on ABC Television, to honor the top musicians in the genre of rock music.

|-
| 1989
| Himself
| Artist of the Year 
|

Ivor Novello Awards
The Ivor Novello Awards are presented annually in London by the British Academy of Composers and Songwriters. Michael received six awards.

|-
|rowspan="4"| 1985 || George Michael || Songwriter of the Year || 
|-
|rowspan="2"| "Careless Whisper" || Most Performed Work || 
|-
| Best Song Musically and Lyrically || 
|-
| "Wake Me Up Before You Go-Go" ||rowspan="3"| International Hit of the Year || 
|-
| 1987 || "The Edge of Heaven" || 
|-
|rowspan="3"| 1989 || "Faith" || 
|-
| "Father Figure" || Best Contemporary Song || 
|-
| rowspan="2"|George Michael || rowspan="2" | Songwriter of the Year || 
|-
|rowspan="2"| 1997 || 
|-
| "Fastlove " || Most Performed Work || 
|-
| 2005 || "Amazing" || PRS Most Performed Work ||

Juno Awards
The Juno Awards is a Canadian awards ceremony presented annually by the Canadian Academy of Recording Arts and Sciences. Michael received six nominations.

|-
| rowspan="3" | 1985 || Make It Big || International Album of the Year || 
|-
| "Careless Whisper" || rowspan="3" | International Single of the Year || 
|-
| "Wake Me Up Before You Go-Go" || 
|-
| rowspan="3" | 1989 || "Faith" || 
|-
| Faith || International Album of the Year || 
|-
| George Michael || International Entertainer of the Year ||

MTV Europe Music Awards
The MTV Europe Music Awards is an annual awards ceremony established in 1994 by MTV Europe. Michael received one award from six nominations.

|-
| rowspan="2" | 1996 || "Fastlove" || MTV Amour || 
|-
| rowspan="3" | George Michael || rowspan="3" | Best Male || 
|-
| 1997 || 
|-
| rowspan="3" | 1999 || 
|-
| rowspan="2" | "As" || Best Song || 
|-
| Best Video ||

MTV Video Music Awards
The MTV Video Music Awards is an annual awards ceremony established in 1984 by MTV. Michael received four awards from sixteen nominations.

|-
|rowspan="3"|  ||rowspan="2"| "Father Figure" || Best Direction in a Video || 
|-
| Best Cinematography in a Video || 
|-
| "Faith" || Best Art Direction in a Video || 
|-
|  || George Michael || Video Vanguard (Career Achievement) || 
|-
|rowspan="5"|  ||rowspan="5"| "Freedom! '90" || Best Cinematography in a Video || 
|-
| Best Direction in a Video || 
|-
| Best Male Video || 
|-
| Best Art Direction in a Video || 
|-
| Best Editing in a Video || 
|-
|rowspan="3"|  ||rowspan="3"| "Papa Was a Rollin' Stone" || International Viewer's Choice Award—MTV Europe || 
|-
| Best Male Video || 
|-
| Breakthrough Video || 
|-
|rowspan="3"|  ||rowspan="3"| "Fastlove" || International Viewer's Choice Award—MTV Europe || 
|-
| Best Dance Video || 
|-
| Best Choreography in a Video || 
|-
|  || "Freedom! '90" || Best Video (That Should Have Won a Moonman) ||

Music Week Awards
The Music Week Awards are the UK's only music awards that recognise labels, publishing, live, retail, A&R, radio, marketing and PR.

|-
| 2018
| rowspan=2|Himself
| rowspan=2|Catalogue Marketing Champaign
| 
|-
| 2021
|

Music Video Production Awards
The MVPA Awards are annually presented by a Los Angeles-based music trade organization to honor the year's best music videos.

|-
| rowspan="2" | 2003
| rowspan="2" |  "Freeek!"
| Best International Video 
| 
|-
| Best Special Effects 
| 
|-
| rowspan="2" | 2005
| rowspan="2" | "Flawless (Go to the City)"
| Best Pop Video
| 
|-
| Best Director of a Male Artist 
| 
|-
| 2013
| "White Light"
| Director of the Year 
|

NME Awards
The NME Awards are annual music awards show founded by the music magazine NME.

|-
| 1997
| Himself
| Best Solo Artist
| 
|-
| 2018
| Freedom
| Best Music Film
|

Pollstar Concert Industry Awards
The Pollstar Concert Industry Awards is an annual award ceremony to honor artists and professionals in the concert industry.

|-
| rowspan=2|1989
| rowspan=2|The Faith Tour
| Major Tour of the Year
| 
|-
| Most Creative Stage Production
|

Rock and Roll Hall of Fame

The Rock and Roll Hall of Fame is a museum located on the shores of Lake Erie in downtown Cleveland, Ohio, United States, dedicated to the recording history of some of the best-known and most influential artists, producers, and other people who have influenced the music industry.

|-
|2023 
| Himself 
| Performer
| Hall of Fame
|

Silver Clef Awards
The Silver Clef Awards are an annual UK music awards lunch which has been running since 1976. Michael has received one award.

|-
| 1989
| Himself 
| Silver Clef Award
|

Smash Hits Poll Winners Party
The Smash Hits Poll Winners Party was an awards ceremony which ran from 1988 to 2005. Each award winner was voted by readers of the Smash Hits magazine.

|-
| 1989 
| rowspan=4|Himself
| rowspan=2|Best Male Solo Singer
| 
|-
| rowspan=5|1990
| 
|-
| Most Fanciable Male
| 
|-
| Best Dressed Person
| 
|-
| Listen Without Prejudice Vol. 1
| Best LP
| 
|-
| "Praying for Time"
| Best Single
| 
|-
| 1991
| rowspan=2|Himself
| rowspan=2|Best Male Solo Singer
| 
|-
| 1996
|

UK Music Video Awards

The UK Music Video Awards is an annual award ceremony founded in 2008 to recognise creativity, technical excellence and innovation in music videos and moving images for music.

 
|-
| 2012
| "White Light"
| Best Pop Video - UK
|  
|-
| rowspan=2|2020
| rowspan=2|"Always" (with Waze & Odyssey, Mary J. Blige & Tommy Theo)
| Best Dance/Electronic Video - UK
| 
|-
| Best Choreography in a Video
|

Žebřík Music Awards

!Ref.
|-
| 1996
| "Fastlove"
| rowspan=2|Best International Video
| 
| 
|-
| 2002
| "Shoot the Dog"
| 
| 
|-
| 2006
| Twenty Five
| Best International Music DVD
| 
| 
|-
| rowspan=2|2011
| Himself
| Best International Male
| 
| rowspan=3|
|-
| Symphonica Tour
| Best International Live
| 
|-
| 2016
| Death of George Michael
| Best International Průser
|

References

External links
 George Michael's official website

Awards
Michael, George
Michael, George